Frénois may refer to the following places:

 La Martre, Var, a commune in the Var department, France
 La Martre, Quebec, a municipality in Quebec, Canada